Variecolin is a bio-active ascomycete isolate.

External links
 Immunomodulatory constituents from an ascomycete, Emericella aurantio-brunnea

Ascomycota
Cyclopentanes